Delap SDA School, also known as Majuro SDA School or Seventh-day Adventist is a private co-educational K-12 Christian school operated by the Guam-Micronesia Mission of Seventh-day Adventists.  It is located in Delap, on the island of Majuro, in the Republic of the Marshall Islands.  The school is located directly beside the Majuro Cooperative School, and within  of the hospital and the capitol building.

History

Delap SDA School was founded in 1978.  Throughout the history of the school, it has been operated by student missionaries attending Seventh-day Adventist colleges and universities across the world, but primarily from North America, Brazil, and the Philippines.

Campus

The school campus is home to a gymnasium/cafeteria building, the administration/high school building, and an elementary school building.  The campus is also home to the Delap Seventh-day Adventist church, as well as living quarters for the faculty and staff of the school. Like much of the Marshall Islands, the school is located directly beside the Pacific Ocean.

Academics

The language of instruction at the school is English, from kindergarten through grade 12.  The school, like the other private schools on Majuro, is known for test results that are higher than the public school system.  The school uniforms are a purple dress and white blouse for girls, and black pants and a purple collared shirt for boys.

Athletics

Delap SDA School competes in athletic competitions against the other high schools on Majuro, and occasionally from other islands.  The school competes in boys and girls basketball and volleyball, and occasionally in soccer as well.  The team name is the Shrenz.

Affiliates

A sister school operates in Laura, called Laura SDA School.  Laura SDA School offers K-8 education.

See also

Seventh-day Adventist Church
Seventh-day Adventist education
List of Seventh-day Adventist secondary schools

References

External links
Delap SDA School's Facebook page

Schools in the Marshall Islands
Majuro
Secondary schools affiliated with the Seventh-day Adventist Church
Educational institutions established in 1978